Mangesh Hadawale (born 2 September 1981 in Maharashtra, India) is an Indian film writer-director and ad-film maker. His first film Tingya (2008, Marathi) received huge commercial as well as critical acclaim. Dekh Indian Circus, his second film was in Hindi and has received many national and international awards.

Biography
Mangesh Hadawale was born in Rajuri village in Junnar, Maharashtra in a farming family. After completing his schooling in the Government Marathi School, Mangesh moved to Pune. In 2001 he completed graduation in theater from the Center for Performing Arts (also known as Lalit Kala Kendra.), University of Pune. He moved to Mumbai to pursue his passion of films and wrote his first script Tingya. It took him five years and 41 rejections to finally find a production house. Tingya went on to become a huge critical and commercial success.

After Tingya, Mangesh's next project in Hindi language Dekh Indian Circus was produced by Sundial Pictures. The film starring Nawazuddin Siddiqui and Tannishtha Chatterjee premiered at the 16th Busan Film Festival and won the prestigious PSB/KNN Audience Award. Dekh Indian Circus has won many national and international awards.

Mangesh is actively involved with creating multilingual ad and corporate films in the agricultural-rural sector. He has worked with brands like ICICI Bank, ICICI Lombard, MAHYCO, Bayer, UPL, Pesticides India, JU Agri Sciences and most recently Tropical Organic Agro Systems. He also directed Bill Gates Foundation's social awareness TVCs for Sutradhar Media & Communication PVT. LTD. and Pradeep Sarkar's Apocalypso Filmworks.

Mangesh made his foray into production with Tapaal, a Marathi film released in 2014. The film about a childless couple and a kid was written by Mangesh and directed by his close friend and cinematographer Laxman Utekar. He also served as a jury member at the 62nd National Film Awards, India in 2015. In 2016, an exclusive festival of his three films was held in four cities of USA.

While working on malaal, he wrote and directed Chalo Jeete Hain, a short film about a boy and his quest to find purpose of life. Film won National Award for Best Film on Family Values ...chalo jeete hain received unimaginable response and acclaim for a short film in India. The film premiered on ten channels of Star TV network simultaneously on 29 July 2018. Mangesh's 2019 directorial is titled Malaal which is being produced by Sanjay Leela Bhansali's SLB Films.

Personal life 
Mangesh continues to split his time between films and farming. On 18 April 2010, Mangesh married his childhood friend Vrushali in Rajuri. The couple have two sons. Mangesh enjoys being connected to his roots and has continued farming at his native place. He is also part of ventures Parashar Agri-tourism and Hachiko Tourism in Junnar.

Filmography
 Tingya (2008) as Writer-Director
 Dekh Indian Circus (unreleased) as Writer-Director
  Tapaal  (2014) Writer-Producer
 Chalo Jeete Hain (2018) Writer-Director
 Malaal (2019) as Writer-Director
 Thai Massage (2022) as Writer-Director

Awards and nominations
 2008: MTV PEPSI youth Icon
 2008: Best Director (Tingya): Mumbai Academy of Moving Images (MAMI) festival
 2008: Best Director (Tingya): Government of Maharashtra
 2008: Best Debutant Director (Tingya): G. Aravindan National Award
 2008: Best Debutant Director (Tingya): P. Lankesh National Award, Bangalore
 2008: FIPRESCI International Critics Award for Director (Tingya): MAMI International film festival, Mumbai
 2008: Best story (Tingya): Maharashtra Government award
 2008: Sant Tukaram Award for Best Marathi Feature Film: Pune International Film Festival, Government of Maharashtra
 2008: Best Dialogue (Tingya): Late. Acharya Atre Award.
 2008 : selected in the "Indian Panorama" at International Film Festival of India  
 2011: PSB/KNN Audience Award (Dekh Indian Circus): 16th Busan International Film Festival
 2011: Golden Plaque Award for Second Best Film (Dekh Indian Circus): International Children's Film Festival, Hyderabad
 2012: Best Children's Film Golden Reel Award (Dekh Indian Circus): 11th Tiburon International Film Festival, California
 2012: Opening Film (Dekh Indian Circus): 9th Stuttgart Indian Film Festival
 2011: Nominated (Dekh Indian Circus): 47th Chicago International Film Festival
 2011: Nominated (Dekh Indian Circus): 23rd Palm Springs International Film Festival, California
 2011: Nominated (Dekh Indian Circus): 22nd Stockholm International Film Festival
 2012: Nominated (Dekh Indian Circus): 12th New York Indian Film Festival
 2012: Nominated (Dekh Indian Circus): 10th Los Angeles Indian Film Festival
 2012: Nominated (Dekh Indian Circus): 11th East End Film Festival, London
 2012: Nominated (Dekh Indian Circus): 3rd London Indian Film Festival
 2013: Best Children Film (Dekh Indian Circus): National Film Awards 2012
 2014: Tapaal World Premiere 18th Busan International Film Festival, South Korea 
 2014: Tapaal selected in the "44th Indian Panorama" at International Film Festival of India
 2014: Official Premiere 12th Pune International Film Festival, India
 2015: Nominated (Tapaal): Best story, First Marathi Filmfare awards, Mumbai
 2015: Nominated (Tapaal): Best screenplay, First Marathi Filmfare awards, Mumbai
 2019: Chalo jeete hain won National Award for the Best Non- Feature Film on Family Values

References

External links
 http://tingya-a-film.blogspot.com
 https://web.archive.org/web/20140307123506/http://www.marathimovieworld.com/news/45th-state-film-award.php
 http://www.dnaindia.com/entertainment/report_the-terrific-trio-rahul-mishra-mangesh-hadawale-and-ankit-fadia_1215818
 https://web.archive.org/web/20080906110755/http://in.movies.yahoo.com/news-detail/17971/Marathi-film-TINGYA-bags-awards.html
 
 https://web.archive.org/web/20120301214611/http://www.fipresci.org/festivals/archive/2008/mumbai_fiction/mumbai2008_ndx.htm
 Hindustan Times
 https://web.archive.org/web/20100131055556/http://passionforcinema.com/tingya-an-experience-to-behold/

Film directors from Maharashtra
Living people
1981 births
People from Pune district
Savitribai Phule Pune University alumni
Directors who won the Best Children's Film National Film Award